Luis Ortiz (born 12 January 1951) is a Colombian sports shooter. He competed in the men's 50 metre free pistol event at the 1984 Summer Olympics.

References

1951 births
Living people
Colombian male sport shooters
Olympic shooters of Colombia
Shooters at the 1984 Summer Olympics
Place of birth missing (living people)
20th-century Colombian people
Shooters at the 1983 Pan American Games
Medalists at the 1983 Pan American Games
Pan American Games medalists in shooting
Pan American Games bronze medalists for Colombia